Kinga Magdalena Gajewska (born July 22, 1990, in Warsaw) is a Polish politician, political scientist,
lawyer and local government official. She was a member of the 8th and 9th Polish parliaments.

Biography 

Gajewska attended the Stefan Zeromski Bilingual High School in Warsaw. In 2011–2012, she
obtained a scholarship to the Free University of Berlin, where she graduated from the School of Political Leaders. Since 2010, she has been running her own business.

A graduate of political science at the Faculty of Journalism and Political Science at the University of Warsaw (2014) and a graduate of doctoral studies at the same faculty (2017), in 2018 she obtained a master's degree in law
from the university's Faculty of Law and Administration.

In 2008 she joined the Civic Platform party, and was appointed to the regional and local party
authorities. She assumed the position of chair for the Young Democrats Association in
Warsaw, and then in the Mazovia Voivodeship.
She ran unsuccessfully in the 2014 elections to the European Parliament (where she received 6221
votes). In the local government elections of the same year, she was elected councillor in the
Mazovian Parliament (receiving 10,004 votes) from the list of the Civic Platform party (Platforma
Obywatelska).
In the parliamentary elections in 2015, on behalf of the Civic Platform, she ran for Parliament
representing the Warsaw district. She was elected an MP for the 8th Parliamentary term of office, receiving 4,820 votes.

In Parliament, she was a member of the Education, Science and
Youth Committee and of the Justice and Human Rights Committee, and also worked in the
Digitization, Innovation and Modern Technologies Committee (2015–2016). She was also 
chair of the Parliamentary Group on the Future of Education 
In the 2019 elections, she successfully ran for parliamentary re-election, running on behalf of the
Civic Coalition party (Koalicja Obywatelstwa) and receiving 35,912 votes.

Personal life 
In 2018, she married MP Arkadiusz Myrcha, with whom she has three children.

She is a competitive motocross rider. In the 2013 season, she took third place in the Polish
championship and in the 2014 season, she was selected for the national team. She was
also appointed to the Women's Committee of the Polish Motor Association. She was a co-
organizer of the first Polish MX Women's Cup in 2011 and the Polish Women's Motocross
Championship in 2013.

For 12 years she was a member of the Latin American dance formation "BRAWKO" ensemble. In the
years 1999–2003 she took part in the Polish Dance Formation Championships in Kraśnik, winning
several times the runner-up prize in the Latin category, as well as placing at the International
Children's Song and Dance Festival in Konin, receiving many silver and bronze medals for her
performances.

References 

21st-century Polish politicians
University of Warsaw alumni
1990 births
Living people
21st-century Polish lawyers